Mario Vanegas (born 22 July 1939) is a former Colombian cyclist. He competed at the 1960, 1964 and 1968 Summer Olympics.

References

External links
 

1939 births
Living people
Colombian male cyclists
Olympic cyclists of Colombia
Cyclists at the 1960 Summer Olympics
Cyclists at the 1964 Summer Olympics
Cyclists at the 1968 Summer Olympics
Sportspeople from Antioquia Department
20th-century Colombian people